C.B. Geetha is an Indian politician, who was the municipal councillor of  Thrissur, Kerala and also chaired as Town Planning Standing Committee Chairman for Thrissur Municipal Corporation, representing the Olarikara ward.

She is the daughter of veteran Congress leader and ex-minister C. N. Balakrishnan and a working member of  Indian National Congress, serving as  the General Secretary to the Thrissur District Congress Committee. She also holds various profiles, including Chairperson of State Cooperative Insurance Society, Kerala,  President of Thrissur District Mahila Cooperative Society and Kerala Khadi Village Industries Association, Avinissery, Thrissur.

References

External links
Official Facebook Page of C B Geetha

Indian National Congress politicians from Kerala
Women in Kerala politics
Malayali politicians
Living people
1965 births
People from Thrissur district
21st-century Indian women politicians
21st-century Indian politicians